Philogeniidae is a family of damselflies belonging to the order Odonata.

Genera:
 Archaeopodagrion
 Philogenia

References

Odonata
Odonata families